Héctor Alberto Bailetti Córdova (born 27 November 1947) is a former Peruvian football striker.

Career
Born in Chincha Alta, Bailetti began playing football with Porvenir Miraflores. He joined Club Universitario de Deportes in 1968, and helped the club to two Peruvian league titles and a runners-up finish in the 1972 Copa Libertadores. He joined Defensor Lima in 1974, helping the club reach the semi-finals of the 1974 Copa Libertadores.

In 1975, Bailetti moved abroad to play for Boca Juniors. He made his Primera División Argentina debut against Racing Club de Avellaneda on 20 March 1975. After a few months with Boca Juniors, Bailetti played for Atlante F.C. and Zacatepec in the Primera División de México.

Bailetti returned to Peru in 1977, finishing his career with Sporting Cristal in 1978.

He made a total of 41 appearances, scoring 15 goals, in the Copa Libertadores.

Bailetti made 18 appearances and scored five goals for the Peru national football team from 1968 to 1973.

References

External links
 
 
 
 Héctor Bailetti at BDFA.com.ar 

1947 births
Living people
People from Ica Region
Association football forwards
Peruvian footballers
Peru international footballers
Club Universitario de Deportes footballers
Boca Juniors footballers
Atlante F.C. footballers
Club Atlético Zacatepec players
Sporting Cristal footballers
Peruvian Primera División players
Peruvian Segunda División players
Argentine Primera División players
Liga MX players
Peruvian expatriate footballers
Expatriate footballers in Mexico
Expatriate footballers in Argentina